Pumpin Blood is a debut EP by Swedish trio NONONO, released digitally on 17 September 2013 through Warner Music in Australia, New Zealand, Mexico and Japan, and Warner Bros. Records in the United States. The EP has peaked at number 37 on the Billboard Top Heatseekers chart.

Track listing

Charts

Release history

References

2013 EPs
NoNoNo (band) albums